Sativanorte is a town and municipality in the Colombian Department of Boyacá, part of the subregion of the Northern Boyacá Province. Sativanorte borders Susacón in the north, in the south Sativasur and Tutazá, in the west Onzaga of the department of Santander and in the east Jericó and Socotá.

Etymology 
The names for Sativanorte and Sativasur are derived from the cacique Sátiva, which in the Chibcha language of the Muisca means: "Captain of the Sun".

History 
Sativanorte and Sativasur were called Sátiva in the times before the Spanish conquest of the Muisca on the central highlands (Altiplano Cundiboyacense) of Colombia. Sátiva was inhabited during the Herrera Period and later, as part of the Muisca Confederation, ruled by the cacique Tundama, from the city with the same name, today known as Duitama. The Spanish conquistadores who conquered the area submitting the Muisca in 1540 were Gonzalo Suárez Rendón and Hernán Pérez de Quesada. Sátiva was founded in 1633 and modern Sativanorte was founded on March 15, 1934.

Geology 
Rocks outcropping around Sativanorte are metamorphic quartzites, phyllites and schists of Paleozoic age. Locally also sandstones and siltstones are present. The southern boundary of the territory is formed by the Chicamocha fault, the western boundary forms the Chaguaca fault. Through the municipality runs the Soapága fault with a northeastern strike.

Economy 
Main economical activities in Sativanorte are agriculture, livestock farming and ecotourism. To the north the Chicamocha Canyon is located and to the east the Sierra Nevada del Cocuy.

Gallery

References 

Municipalities of Boyacá Department
Populated places established in 1934
Muisca Confederation
Muysccubun